The Energy Subcommittee on Environment, Manufacturing and Critical Minerals is a subcommittee within the House Committee on Energy and Commerce. Prior to 2009, it was known as the Subcommittee on Environment and Hazardous Materials; it was part of the Subcommittee on Energy and Environment from 2009 to 2011. In December 2010, Representative Fred Upton, the incoming chairman of the Energy and Commerce Committee for the 112th Congress, announced his intention to establish the Environment and Economy Subcommittee as a separate subcommittee. In January 2023, new Chair of the full committee Cathy McMorris Rodgers amended the subcommittee's jurisdiction, transferring responsibility for climate policy to the United States House Energy Subcommittee on Energy, Climate and Grid Security, while adding broader manufacturing policy to the jurisdiction of this subcommittee.

Jurisdiction
According to its website the subcommittee dealt with the following; "All matters related to soil, air, and water contamination, including Superfund and the Resource Conservation and Recovery Act; the regulation of solid, hazardous, and nuclear wastes, including mining, nuclear, oil, gas, and coal combustion waste; the Clean Air Act and air emissions; emergency environmental response; industrial plant security, including cybersecurity; the regulation of drinking water (Safe Drinking Water Act), including underground injection of fluids (e.g., deep well injection or hydrofracking); toxic substances (Toxic Substances Control Act); noise; and all aspects of the above-referenced jurisdiction related to the Department of Homeland Security."

Members, 118th Congress

Historical membership rosters

115th Congress

116th Congress

117th Congress

External links
Official website

References

Energy Environment